Lewis Mill may refer to:

Lewis Mill (Telluride, Colorado), a historic building
Lewis Mill Complex, a historic mill in Maryland
Lewis Mill, Missouri, an unincorporated community

See also
Lewis Mills (disambiguation)
Lewis H. Mills House (disambiguation)